A Man for All Seasons is a play by Robert Bolt based on the life of Sir Thomas More. An early form of the play had been written for BBC Radio in 1954, and a one-hour live television version starring Bernard Hepton was produced in 1957 by the BBC, but after Bolt's success with The Flowering Cherry, he reworked it for the stage.

It was first performed in London opening at the Globe Theatre (now Gielgud Theatre) on 1 July 1960. It later found its way to Broadway, enjoying a critically and commercially successful run of over a year. It has had several revivals, and was subsequently made into a multi-Academy Award-winning 1966 feature film and a 1988 television movie.

The plot is based on the historical events leading up to the execution of More, the 16th-century Chancellor of England, who refused to endorse Henry VIII's wish to divorce his wife Catherine of Aragon, who did not bear him a son, so that he could marry Anne Boleyn, the sister of his former mistress.

The play portrays More as a man of principle, envied by rivals such as Thomas Cromwell and loved by the common people and by his family.

Title 
The title reflects 20th century agnostic playwright Robert Bolt's portrayal of More as the ultimate man of conscience. As one who remains true to himself and his beliefs while adapting to all circumstances and times, despite external pressure or influence, More represents "a man for all seasons."  Bolt borrowed the title from Robert Whittington, a contemporary of More, who in 1520 wrote of him:

"More is a man of an angel's wit and singular learning. I know not his fellow. For where is the man of that gentleness, lowliness and affability? And, as time requireth, a man of marvelous mirth and pastimes, and sometime of as sad gravity. A man for all seasons."

Themes 

A Man for All Seasons struggles with ideas of identity and conscience. More argues repeatedly that a person is defined by his conscience. His own position is depicted as almost indefensible; the Pope is described as a "bad" and corrupt individual, forced by the Emperor Charles V to act according to his will. But as More says to Norfolk, "What matters is not that it's true, but that I believe it; or no, not that I believe it, but that I believe it."  More fears that if he breaks with his conscience, he will be damned to hell, while his associates and friends are more concerned with holding onto their own temporal power.

At another key point of the play, More testifies before an inquiry committee and Norfolk attempts to persuade him to sign the Succession to the Crown Act 1534 (pp. 78, Heinemann edition):

Norfolk:
 Oh, confound all this. ... I'm not a scholar, as Master Cromwell never tires of pointing out, and frankly, I don't know whether the marriage was lawful or not. But damn it, Thomas, look at those names. ... You know those men! Can't you do what I did, and come with us, for fellowship?

More:
 And when we stand before God, and you are sent to Paradise for doing according to your conscience, and I am damned for not doing according to mine, will you come with me - for "fellowship"?

More's persecution is made to seem even more unjust by the inclusion of Eustace Chapuys, the long-time Imperial ambassador to England, in the story. Chapuys recognizes More as a stout man of the church, and in Act II, after More's resignation from the Chancellorship, he informs More of a planned rebellion along the Scottish border, expecting More to be sympathetic. Instead, More informs Norfolk of the plot, showing him to be patriotic and loyal to the King. This, along with More's refusal to speak out against the King, shows him to be a loyal subject, and thus Cromwell appears to prosecute him out of personal spite and because he disagrees with the King's divorce.

Bolt also establishes an anti-authoritarian theme which recurs throughout his works. All people in positions of power – King Henry, Cromwell, Wolsey, Cranmer, Chapuys, even Norfolk – are depicted as being either corrupt, evil, or at best expedient and power-hungry. Bolt's later plays and film screenplays also delve into this theme. The theme of corruption is also illustrated, in Rich's rise to power, the Common Man being drawn into the events of the storyline, and in the (deliberately) anachronistic portrayal of Henry as a younger, athletic man (in 1530 he would have been almost forty and already putting on weight).

Although it is the law that eventually forces More's execution, the play also makes several powerful statements in support of the rule of law. At one point More's future son-in-law, Roper, urges him to arrest Richard Rich, whose perjury will eventually lead to More's execution. More answers that Rich has broken no law, "And go he should if he were the Devil himself until he broke the law!"  Roper is appalled at the idea of granting the Devil the benefit of law, but More is adamant.

"What would you do? Cut a great road through the law to get after the Devil? ... And when the last law was down, and the Devil turned round on you – where would you hide, Roper, the laws all being flat? This country is planted thick with laws from coast to coast, Man's laws, not God's, and if you cut them down – and you're just the man to do it – do you really think you could stand upright in the winds that would blow then? Yes, I give the Devil benefit of law, for my own safety's sake!"

The character of the Common Man serves as a narrator and framing device. A Brechtian character, he plays various small parts – More's servant, a publican, a boatman, More's jailer, jury foreman and executioner—who appear throughout the play, both taking part in and commenting on the action. Several sequences involving this character break the fourth wall—most notably, a sequence where the Common Man attempts to exit the stage and is addressed by Cromwell, who identifies him as a jury foreman. (Indeed, the "jury" consists of sticks or poles with the hats of the Common Man's various characters put on top.) The place of the Common Man in history is emphasized when he says in his opening speech,

"the sixteenth century was the century of the Common Man-like all the other centuries."

Bolt created the Common Man for two main reasons: to illustrate the place and influence of the average person in history, even though they are usually overlooked, and to try to prevent the audience from sympathising with the more titled characters such as More, realising that the audience is more closely related to him—a classic case of Brechtian alienation. The character's role in the story has been interpreted in many different ways by different critics, from being a positive to a negative character. Bolt's own view (expressed in the preface to the play) was that he was intended to draw the audience into the play and that "common" denoted "that which is common to us all." Several of Bolt's subsequent works feature similar characters (e.g. The Thwarting of Baron Bolligrew, State of Revolution).

Endings 

Two different endings were written by Bolt. The original ending, performed during the show's preliminary run in England, had Cromwell and Chapuys confront each other after More's execution and then exit the stage, hand in hand, chuckling with "the self-mocking, self-indulgent, rather rueful laughter of the men who know what the world is and how to be comfortable in it".

This particular ending is exemplary of Bolt's notion of "riding with the current", as is demonstrated by "men who know what the world is and how to be comfortable in it", forsaking one's conscience in exchange of a life of "convenience". For the show's London production – and most, if not all, subsequent runs of the show – the Common Man sheds his executioner's garb and addresses the audience one final time:

"... It isn't difficult to keep alive, friends – just don't make trouble – or if you must make trouble, make the sort of trouble that's expected... If we should bump into one another, recognize me."

The film version of the play ends with More's execution, followed by a narrator reading off the fates of the various characters involved (originally, this was dialogue spoken by the Common Man prior to the Tower of London Inquiry).

Stage productions
Paul Scofield, who played the leading role in the West End premiere, reprised it on Broadway in 1961, winning a Tony Award. Both productions were directed by Noel Willman.

The original West End cast, playing at the Globe Theatre (now Gielgud Theatre), included:
The Common Man – Leo McKern
Sir Thomas More – Paul Scofield
Richard Rich – John Brown
Duke of Norfolk – Alexander Gauge
Alice More – Wynne Clark
Margaret – Pat Keen
Cardinal Wolsey – Willoughby Goddard
Thomas Cromwell – Andrew Keir
Chapuys – Geoffrey Dunn
Attendant – Brian Harrison
Will Roper – John Carson
Henry VIII – Richard Leech
Woman – Beryl Andrews
Archbishop Cranmer – William Roderick

In London, Man ran simultaneously to another of Bolt's plays, The Tiger and the Horse. Both plays were major hits, although Horse was the more successful of the two. British critical reaction was largely positive, albeit reservedly so; few reviews at the time regarded the play as a classic. The show ran for 320 performances.

In the US, the play was first performed on Broadway on 22 November 1961, at the ANTA Playhouse

Original Broadway cast
The Common Man – George Rose
Sir Thomas More – Paul Scofield
The Duke of Norfolk – Albert Dekker
Thomas Cromwell – Leo McKern (later Thomas Gomez)
King Henry VIII – Keith Baxter
Margaret More – Olga Bellin
William Roper – Peter Brandon
Catherine Anger – Sarah Burton
Attendant – John Colenback
Cardinal Wolsey – Jack Creley
Alice More- Carol Goodner
Thomas Cranmer – Lester Rawlins
Richard Rich – William Redfield
Signor Chapuys – David J. Stewart

The Broadway production was a huge hit, running for 620 performances. While the play had drawn mixed critical reviews in London, it was almost unanimously praised by the New York critics, who showered it with plaudits and awards. At the 16th Annual Tony Awards, the production earned four nominations, winning in all four categories it was nominated, including Tonys for Bolt, Scofield, and Willman.

Leo McKern played the Common Man in the West End version of the show, but was shifted to the role of Cromwell for the Broadway production – a role he later reprised in the film. While playing Cromwell, he appeared with one brown and one blue eye (McKern of course had lost an eye in an accident and wore a glass one) to accentuate his character's evil nature.

Charlton Heston played More in several versions of the play-off-Broadway in the 1970s and 1980s, eventually playing it in the West End. The play was a success and the West End production was taken to Aberdeen, Scotland, for a week where it was staged at His Majesty's Theatre. Heston considered it among his favourite roles. He also produced, directed, and starred in a film version of it (see below). The production gained a sort of notoriety when Dustin Hoffman spread the story that Heston, who was bald, was so vain that he wore a wig over his hairpiece, rather than let the public view his actual bald pate.

Another famous graduate of the play is Ian McKellen, whose first theatrical role was as Will Roper in a revival production in the late 1960s. He would go on to play More in a later run of the show. Faye Dunaway also made her stage debut as a replacement Margaret in the original Broadway run.

An acclaimed Canadian production starring William Hutt and directed by Walter Learning was presented at the Vancouver Playhouse and the Stratford Festival in 1986. At Stratford the production was paired with a production of Shakespeare's Henry VIII, with both plays sharing many actors, and showing two perspectives on historical events.

The play was staged in London's West End at the Theatre Royal, Haymarket starring Martin Shaw and produced by Bill Kenwright. It closed on 1 April 2006.

A Broadway revival of the show, produced by the Roundabout Theatre Company, starring Frank Langella as More and directed by Doug Hughes, played at the American Airlines Theatre through December 2008. In this production, the character of The Common Man was deleted by the director (as Bolt had done when adapting his play for the first film version).  Jeremy Strong made his Broadway debut in this production as Richard Rich.

In 2008, Thomas More was also portrayed on stage in Hong Kong as an allegorical symbol of the Pan-democracy camp resisting Chinese Communism when Hardy Tsoi, after translating A Man for All Seasons, mainly into Cantonese, but also with some parts in Mandarin, Spanish, Latin, and English, produced it as a play within a play. Similarities were noted between More and contemporary pro-democracy politicians in Hong Kong such as Martin Lee and Szeto Wah, with the Vatican being seen as representing British colonialism while Henry VIII and his regime were seen as representing Communist China "suppressing democracy and freedom" in Hong Kong. According to Chapman Chen, Hardy Tsoi's version of the play is one of a number of Hong Kong works that suggest that mainstream postcolonial theories which invariably portray European colonialism as oppressive need to be "modified or balanced" to reflect the different experience of places like Hong Kong.

Film and television movies
The play was adapted for Australian television in 1964.

1966 film

Paul Scofield, who played the leading role in the West End and Broadway stage premieres, played More again in the first of two film versions (1966), winning an Oscar in the process. The film also stars Robert Shaw as Henry VIII, Orson Welles as Wolsey, Corin Redgrave as Will Roper, Nigel Davenport as Norfolk, a young John Hurt as Richard Rich, and an older Wendy Hiller as Lady Alice, More's second wife. It was directed by Fred Zinnemann. In addition to the Best Actor Oscar won by Scofield, the film won Academy Awards for screenplay, cinematography, costume design, Best Director, and Best Picture.

1988 film

The 1988 version starred Charlton Heston (who also directed it) as More, Vanessa Redgrave (who appeared briefly and mutely in the 1966 version as Anne Boleyn) as More's wife, and Sir John Gielgud as Cardinal Wolsey. By coincidence, Gielgud's name now graces the former Globe Theatre, where the original play premiered in 1960.

Radio productions
The play was produced, with the following cast, as the Saturday Night Theatre on BBC Home Service on  28 February 1959:

Sir Thomas More — John Franklyn-Robbins
Master Richard Rich — Michael Cox
Master Thomas Cromwell — David Mahlowe
Cardinal Wolsey — Ralph Hallett
King Henry VIII — David Scase
Duke of Norfolk — David Sumner
Dame Alice More — Cynthia Grenville
Mistress Margaret (Meg) More — Marah Stohl
Archbishop Thomas Cranmer — Stephen MacDonald
The Bishop of Bath — Christopher Benjamin
The Bishop of Durham — Bernard Kay

The play was produced, with the following cast, as the Saturday Play on BBC Radio 4 on 7 October 2006, as part of its Betrayal season:

Sir Thomas More — Charles Dance
Master Richard Rich — Julian Rhind Tutt
Master Thomas Cromwell — Kenneth Cranham
Cardinal Wolsey — Timothy Bateson
King Henry VIII — Brian Cox
Duke of Norfolk — Nicholas le Prevost
Master William Roper — Martin Freeman
Alice More — Kika Markham
Mistress Margaret (Meg) More — Romola Garai
Boatman/Steward (aka Matthew) /Jailer — Dan Chyutin
Archbishop Thomas Cranmer/Headsman — Peter Tate
Catherine of Aragon — Adjoa Andoh

See also
 Trial movies
Cultural depictions of Henry VIII of England

References

External links

 
 
Free Study Guide for "A Man for All Seasons" at TheBestNotes.com
Complete text of the play at cooper.edu (Archived link March 2007)
Complete text of the play at veng6a.pbworks.com

1960 plays
British plays adapted into films
Plays based on actual events
Plays based on real people
Plays set in England
Plays set in the 16th century
Tony Award-winning plays
Works by Robert Bolt
Cultural depictions of Thomas More
Cultural depictions of Henry VIII